Deylaman District is a district (bakhsh) in Siahkal County, Gilan Province, Iran. At the 2006 census, its population was 12,721, in 3,650 families.  The District has one city: Deylaman. The District has two rural districts (dehestan): Deylaman Rural District and Pir Kuh Rural District.

References 

Siahkal County
Districts of Gilan Province